Sean Snyder (born September 21, 1969) is an American football coach who most recently served as the special teams coordinator at the University of Illinois.  He played college football at Kansas State, where he was an All-American punter.

Early years
Snyder earned first-team all-area and second-team all-district honors as a punter and kicker at Greenville High School in Greenville, Texas.  He also played baseball.

College career
After redshirting his first season at the University of Iowa in 1988, Snyder saw action in two games for the Hawkeyes as a redshirt freshman in 1989.  He transferred to Kansas State, following his father, Bill.  Due to NCAA rules, he was forced to sit out the 1990 season.  In 1991, as a junior, he was named the 1991 Big Eight Defensive Newcomer of the Year by the conference coaches after finishing fourth in the league and 27th nationally with a 40.5 punting average.  He also earned honorable mention All-Big Eight honors from the Associated Press and the coaches and out-punted six of his seven Big Eight counterparts in head-to-head matchups, including all three punters that finished ahead of him in the overall statistics.

In 1992 as a senior, he was named first-team All-American by the AP and the AFCA and was named the First first-team All-American at Kansas State since Gary Spani in 1977, a span of 15 years.  Snyder finished his senior season by rewriting the Kansas State punting record book and broke the Wildcat records for best punting average with 52.8 yards per punt. He was also a first team All-Big Eight selection by the Associated Press and the league's coaches. He had at least one punt of 52 yards or more in all but one game and has booted at least one 60-yarder in four of 11 games.

Snyder is the son of former Kansas State head football coach Bill Snyder.

Career statistics

References

1969 births
Living people
American football punters
Iowa Hawkeyes football players
Kansas State Wildcats football coaches
Kansas State Wildcats football players
USC Trojans football coaches
All-American college football players
People from Greenville, Texas
Players of American football from Texas